Josef Keck (8 August 1950 – 11 May 2010) was a German biathlete. He competed in the relay event at the 1976 Winter Olympics.

References

1950 births
2010 deaths
German male biathletes
Olympic biathletes of West Germany
Biathletes at the 1976 Winter Olympics